Allur  is a village in Srirangam taluk of Tiruchirappalli district in Tamil Nadu, India. The village is famous for the Panchanadeeshwarar Temple.

Demographics 

As per the 2001 census, Allur had a population of 3,148 with 1,563 males and 1,585 females. The sex ratio was 1014 and the literacy rate, 82.82.

References 

 

Villages in Tiruchirappalli district